Solar Gambling is the thirteenth studio album by Omar Rodríguez-López as a solo artist. On December 1, 2009 the recording was released digitally via the Rodriguez Lopez Productions website along with a limited pressing of 1,500 colored vinyl (750 clear light yellow, 750 clear light blue). The limited pressings were distributed via the RLP website.

Track listing

Personnel

Ximena Sariñana Rivera – vocals, lyrics
Omar Rodríguez-López – guitars, bass, keys, piano
Marcel Rodriguez-Lopez – synths, piano
Deantoni Parks – drums (1,2,9)
Oscar “Chucho” Perez – drums (4,7)

Release history

References 

2009 albums
Omar Rodríguez-López albums
Albums produced by Omar Rodríguez-López